Rádio Top 100 Oficiální is the official chart of the top ranking songs as based on airplay in the Czech Republic, compiled and published weekly by IFPI Czech Republic.

Below is the list of songs that have reached number one on the Rádio Top 100 Oficiální during the 2010s.

Number-one songs

See also 
2010s in music

References

Czech Republic
2010s